Marion Couthouy Smith (1853–1931) was a poet from the United States. She published three books of poetry between 1906 and 1918 and individual poems through the Harper's Magazine, Century Magazine, Atlantic Monthly, and The New England Magazine.

Biography
Marion Couthouy Smith was born in 1853 the daughter of Henry Pratt of Philadelphia (father) and Maria Couthouy Williams. She graduated 1871 from Miss A. M. Anable's school in Philadelphia.

Books
 Chorister No. 13, a poem, cover by Lee Baker, James Pott & Company, Publishers, c1891.
 A Working Woman published in serial in The Living Church
 Dr. Marks, Socialist, 1897 Online text
 The Electric Spirit and Other Poems, 1906 Online text
 The Road of Life and Other Poems, 1909 Online text
 The Final Star, poems, 1918 Online text

References

External links

Pages with poems from Harpers Magazine
 Her poem, The City
 Her poem, Chicago, with biography for Chicago Worlds Fair

1853 births
1931 deaths
Writers from Seattle
American women poets
19th-century American poets
19th-century American women writers
20th-century American poets
20th-century American women writers
Poets from Washington (state)
Writers from Philadelphia
Poets from Pennsylvania